The following is a list of notable autobiographies:

By profession

See also
 Lists of books

References

Footnotes

Lists of books by type